Hejran Dust (also Romanized as Hejrān Dūst) is a village in Misheh Pareh Rural District, in the Central District of Kaleybar County, East Azerbaijan Province, Iran. At the 2006 census, its population was 196, in 63 families.  In the mid 1950s, the population was 421 people, as reported by Army files.

Hejran Dust was not on the unpaved road, which used by muleteers carrying goods between Kaleybar and surrounding villages. In this respect Aghaweye and Oskolou were well located to offer services. The paved Kaleybar--Oskolou road, completed in 2005, didn't bypass the village. The road boosted the village's importance as a location for building villas. The result is significant; a more recent statistic has reported the village population 311 people in 101 families.

References 

Populated places in Kaleybar County